The American drama television series NCIS has received many awards and nominations since it premiered on September 23, 2003.

ALMA Awards

ASCAP Awards

BMI Film & TV Awards

California on Location

Emmy Awards

Imagen Foundation Awards

NAACP Image Awards

People's Choice Awards

Visual Effects Society Awards

Young Artist Awards

References

External links
 
 
 

NCIS
Awards